The Lutherse Kerk, also known as St. George's Chapel, is an 18th-century church in the Dutch city of Delft. The church's foundation was laid in the 15th or 16th centuries, with a wooden structure being built on top of it. This first wooden church burned down in 1536, and the city of Delft erected an armory where the church had stood. The armory was converted into the current Lutheran church in 1768, and a new stone facade and steeples where added to the existing building.

References 

Lutheran churches in the Netherlands
Churches in South Holland
Buildings and structures in Delft
18th-century Lutheran churches
18th-century churches in the Netherlands